The Trolleyvox is an American Indie pop band from Philadelphia, Pennsylvania. It was formed in 1996 by Andrew Chalfen and Beth Filla.

The band's style drew comparisons to The New Pornographers, while a YouTube video for "Just You Wait" turned it into an anthem against George W. Bush.

After releasing two albums on the New Jersey power-pop label Groove Disques, The Trolleyvox moved to Philadelphia-based label Transit of Venus. Their 2006 release The Trolleyvox Present The Karaoke Meltdowns earned them substantial critical praise, Philadelphia Weekly hailing the album as their best yet. In 2007 the band released a double album Your Secret Safe / Luzerne earning 3.5 stars out of 5 on Allmusic. Your Secret Safe is a full-band album produced by Philadelphia producer Brian McTear (The A-Sides, Matt Pond PA, B.C. Camplight); Luzerne is a mostly acoustic and instrumental album that became a staple on WXPN's Sunday morning broadcast, "Sleepy Hollow."

Bassist Owen Biddle also played in the Philadelphia hip-hop/R&B group The Roots until 2011.

Discography 
 Ephemera for the Future (Groove Disques, 2000)
 Leap of Folly (Groove Disques, 2003)
 The Karaoke Meltdowns (Transit of Venus, 2006)
 Luzerne (Transit of Venus, 2007)
 Your Secret Safe (Transit of Venus, 2007)

References

External links
 The Trolleyvox at MySpace
 [  The Trolleyvox] on Allmusic
 Groove Disques' Entry

Indie rock musical groups from Pennsylvania
Musical groups from Philadelphia